Mandalay State Beach is a protected beach in the city of Oxnard, California, United States. Managed by the California Department of Parks and Recreation, the park preserves an area of undeveloped sand dunes and wetlands that was once common along the  coastline of the Oxnard Plain.

History
The  site was established as a California state park in 1985 to preserve public access to the beach while providing for continued protection of the adjacent natural area. Snowy plovers and least terns nest on the beach.

Facilities
There are no support facilities within the park or on the adjacent city beach. Ample parking on the adjacent public streets provides an access point for California Coastal Trail.

Beachwalkers may reach McGrath State Beach upcoast and Oxnard Beach Park downcoast. These parks can also be reached by the Pacific Coast Bicycle Route on Harbor Boulevard. Mandalay Beach Road is close to the beach and provides an alternate route through the Oxnard Shores neighborhood using public streets and bicycle/walking trails to destinations south, including Channel Islands Harbor and the Channel Islands Beach neighborhood.

See also
List of beaches in California
List of California state parks
 List of state beaches in California

References

External links
 Mandalay Beach Park–County of Ventura
 Mandalay State Beach–California State Parks

1985 establishments in California
Beaches of Southern California
California State Beaches
Parks in Ventura County, California
Protected areas established in 1985
Beaches of Ventura County, California